Idotea is a genus of isopod crustaceans, mostly from cold temperate waters. The taxonomy of the genus is still in doubt, and many of the currently recognised species may be taxonomic synonyms, and others may be moved to different genera.

Species
The genus Idotea includes the following species:

Idotea aleutica Gurjanova, 1933
Idotea balthica (Pallas, 1772)
Idotea brevicauda Dana, 1853
Idotea brevicorna Milne-Edwards, 1840
Idotea chelipes (Pallas, 1766)
Idotea danai Miers, 1881
Idotea delfini Porter, 1903
Idotea emarginata (Fabricius, 1793)
Idotea fewkesi Richardson, 1905
Idotea granulosa Rathke, 1843
Idotea gurjanovae Kussakin, 1974
Idotea indica Milne-Edwards, 1840
Idotea linearis (Linnaeus, 1766)
Idotea metallica Bosc, 1802
Idotea neglecta Sars, 1897
Idotea obscura Rafi, 1972
Idotea ochotensis Brandt, 1851
Idotea orientalis Gurjanova, 1933
Idotea ostroumovi Sowinsky, 1895
Idotea pelagica Leach, 1815
Idotea phosphorea Harger, 1873
Idotea rufescens Fee, 1926
Idotea spasskii Gurjanova, 1950
Idotea urotoma Stimpson, 1864
Idotea whymperi Miers, 1881
Idotea ziczac Barnard, 1951

See also
Pentidotea wosnesenskii

References

Valvifera
Isopod genera
Taxa named by Johan Christian Fabricius